Adrian Baird (born July 15, 1979) is a former professional Canadian football defensive end. He was drafted by the Ottawa Renegades in the fifth round of the 2005 CFL Draft. He played CIS football for the Ottawa Gee-Gees.

Baird also played for the Winnipeg Blue Bombers, Edmonton Eskimos and Hamilton Tiger-Cats.

External links
Just Sports Stats
Hamilton Tiger-Cats bio

1979 births
Living people
Canadian football defensive linemen
Edmonton Elks players
Hamilton Tiger-Cats players
Ottawa Gee-Gees football players
Ottawa Renegades players
Players of Canadian football from Ontario
Sportspeople from Scarborough, Toronto
Canadian football people from Toronto
Winnipeg Blue Bombers players